Ricardo Skippers (born 13 June 1986 in Cape Town, Western Cape) is a South African football (soccer) midfielder and defender for Premier Soccer League club Engen Santos.

External links
Player's profile at absapremiership.co.za
Ricardo Skippers at Mail and Guardian

1986 births
Living people
South African soccer players
Association football midfielders
Association football defenders
Sportspeople from Cape Town
Cape Coloureds
Santos F.C. (South Africa) players